Suno Chanda is a 2018 Pakistani Ramadan special romantic comedy series developed by Shahzad Javed, Head of Content, HUM TV directed by Ahson Talish and written by Saima Akram Chudhery. The series celebrates the Pakistani wedding traditions and relates the story of a couple who are in Nikaah, living separately as the Rukhsati is yet to happen,  and the relationship between their families. It aired everyday on Hum TV. 

It features Iqra Aziz and Farhan Saeed as Jiya and Arsalan respectively in the leading roles while Samina Ahmad, Syed Mohammed Ahmed, Sami Khan, Nadia Afgan, Farah Shah, Sohail Sameer, Farhan Ali Agha, Mizna Waqas, Ali Safina, Tara Mahmood, Adnan Shah Tipu Mashal Khan and Nabeel Zuberi in recurring roles. The series is produced by Momina Duraid under their production banner MD Productions.

The series received five major nominations at the 18th Lux Style Awards, including Best Television Play for Momina Duraid, Best Writer for Choudhary, Best Actress (Critics and Viewers) for Aziz and Best Emerging Talent for Zuberi. It won three Lux Style Awards, including Best Series and Best Actress for Aziz. 
The series received the highest ratings and positive reviews on its premiere, and was the slot leader for the entire time it was on air. Its sequel Suno Chanda 2 was released on 7 May 2019 and ended 5 June 2019 after airing 30 episodes on Hum TV. The show was followed by two sequels Suno Chanda 2 (2019) and an upcoming spinoff Chanda Tara (2023).

Series overview

Plot 
Arsalan Jamshed Ali and Ajiya Nazakat Ali are cousins and live in a joint family. Their family had got them married when they were kids, but the rukhsati is yet to happen. Bi Jaan, their grandmother and head of the family, has two sons, Jamshed Ali and Nazakat Ali and a daughter Masooma who is married to Jalal Khan. They live in Karachi. Jamshed Ali is married to Shahana and Nazakat Ali to Naeema. Jiya has a younger brother Daniyal Nazakat Ali (DJ), who is an aspiring news reporter. Jiya dreams of joining the London School of Economics for higher studies after her BBA.

Arsal and Jiya are childhood companions who play pranks on each other. Bi Jaan decides to get Arsal and Jiya's formal wedding and rukhsati done to honour her husband's last wish. Arsal and Jiya are against the marriage plan and team up with Kinza, Masooma's daughter, to stop the wedding.

Shah Jahan, Bi Jaan's brother-in-law, and his grandson Shehryar who lives in London, visit Pakistan for Arsal and Jiya's planned wedding after Eid. Sherry is close to his cousins and a co-conspirator in their plots to stop the marriage. Sherry asks Arsal and Jiya to resolve their problem amicably. Sherry also helps Jiya to fulfil her dream of joining the London School of Economics, and they plan to study together. Sherry eventually develops feelings for Jiya, which makes Arsal jealous. 

Arsal and Jiya create misunderstandings between their parents. Meanwhile, Sherry falls in love with Jiya. Arsal and Jiya's parents want Arsal to divorce Jiya, but Arsal denies it. Jiya's father sends divorce notice to Arsal, who then confesses his feelings to Jiya. 

Jiya initially rejects Arsal but eventually realises her love for him. 

Later the family discover that Arsal and Jiya have fallen in love. Arsal and Jiya's parents eventually give in to their love, and the wedding preparations begin. Sherry and Kinza also start liking each other. 

Jiya and Arsal argue again on their wedding night but later realise their foolishness and say sorry to each other. They promise not to repeat the same mistakes and confess their love for each other.

Cast

Soundtrack

Music is composed by Naveed Nashad, lyrics were by Ahson Talish.

Release

Broadcast
The series was broadcast by channel's international versions in UK, USA, New Zealand, Australia and Canada. Dubbed versions of the series including, Arabic version aired on MBC Drama under titled "زفاف بلا زوجين" and Persian dubbed version aired on MBC Persia under the title عروسی بی عروسی.  It aired in UK on Zee TV UK also.

It was rebroadcast on national television, PTV Home. It started airing on 21 August 2019 and both seasons were broadcast without a break between them.

Digital release
Alongside the series release on YouTube, it also released on Starzplay and ZEE5.

Reception
The series break previous records of Hum TV and is one of the most successful and watched drama during Ramadan. It is praised for its tune of reality and culture mixed-up with humor and was applauded with positive reviews. Last Episode of the drama aired on 1st day of Eid-ul-Fitr. Aziz and Saeed are praised for their on-screen chemistry, speaking to The Express Tribune, Aziz said that she is overwhelming and was not expect the series to be the massive hit. She further said about the character she played, "Jiya made me feel happy and I was really intrigued by the fact that these two people, married to each other, know each other inside and out, but still don't want to live their lives together. Then, when I found out about their Tom & Jerry dynamic and absolutely loved it!"

Awards and nominations

Sequel 
 
Due to its immense popularity and ratings, the makers announced Season 2. Iqra Aziz confirmed being part of the Season. On 2 October 2018, it was reported that Farhan Saeed had signed up for the project opposite Aziz. On 10 October, it was reported that Nabeel Zuberi had also signed up. The series episodes were aired from the first day of Ramadan, 7 May 2019 and the last episode was aired on 6 June 2019. In October 2019, the third season of Suno Chanda was announced. In an interview with Fuchsia Magazine, Aehsun Talish confirmed that the new season would be coming in Ramadan 2022. However, it was later revealed by writers that there was no season 3 of the show.

See also 
 List of programs broadcast by Hum TV
 Kis Din Mera Viyah Howay Ga (Season 04)

References

External links

Pakistani drama television series
Ramadan special television shows
2018 Pakistani television series debuts
Urdu-language television shows